Fido Dido ( or ) is a cartoon character created by Joanna Ferrone and Sue Rose.

History
Rose first doodled the character in 1985 on a napkin in a restaurant. Ferrone came up with the character’s name on her way to work the next day. The two later stenciled Fido on T-shirts. These T-shirts became very popular in New York, and featured the character's official mantra: "Fido is for Fido. Fido is against no one. Fido is youth. Fido has no age. Fido sees everything. Fido judges nothing. Fido is innocent. Fido is powerful. Fido comes from the past. Fido is the future."

Soft-drink mascot
Fido Dido was licensed to PepsiCo in 1988 but the character did not receive much attention or popularity until the early 1990s, when he appeared on numerous products, particularly stationery and 7-Up ads and boxer shorts. Later, he was replaced with Cool Spot as the 7-Up brand mascot.  Since PepsiCo does not have the rights to 7-Up in the United States (where it is a product of the Dr Pepper Snapple Group), Fido Dido was instead used to promote Slice.    Fido Dido reappeared in the 2000s on cans and advertising for 7-Up worldwide. 

In 2018, Fido Dido has reappeared in the Vintage Series cans. 

Fido Dido is also used on PepsiCo's Turkish soft drink Fruko.

Other
Fido Dido also appeared in Saturday morning bumpers for CBS. His bumpers on CBS started in 1990 and lasted until 1993.

Fido Dido: Life in the Third Lane was published in paperback in 1989.

A large mural of Fido Dido was painted on the side of a building in the city of Guayaquil, Ecuador, in the early 1990s and was nearly erased by the passing of time, creating a sense of nostalgia in the population. After a news article was published by El Universo in March 2019, the mural was repainted in full splendor.

In 1992, Fido Dido appeared in his own magazine in the United Kingdom. The first edition introduced his family, and was titled "Meet the Fidos". It was published by Ravette Publishing.

In 1993, a video game called Fido Dido was made by Kaneko and Bits Studios for the Super NES and Sega Genesis. However, it was never released, because the publisher Kaneko's United States branch shut down in the summer of 1994. There was a Neopets sponsor game starring Fido Dido.

In the early 1990s, Fido Dido had a comic strip in the teenage magazine YM.

Fido Dido appears in the animated short Logorama, as a bystander.

References

External links
 
Brief Information about Fido bumpers during CBS Saturday Morning TV Shows, from Platypus Comix.

Drink advertising characters
Male characters in advertising
Fictional characters introduced in 1985
Comics characters introduced in 1985